North Akoko, usually abbreviated as Akoko and also known as Arigidi, is a dialect cluster spoken in Nigeria. It appears to form a branch of the "Yoruba–Edo–Akoko–Igbo" group of Niger–Congo languages. It is spoken in the LGAs of Akoko North East, Akoko North West, Ekiti East, and Ijumu (Ethnologue).

Varieties
Akokoid varieties include Arigidi, Erúṣú, Oyín, Ìgáṣí Eṣé, Urò, Ọ̀jọ̀, Àfá, Ògè, Ìdò, and Àjè.

Below is a list of Arigidi language names, populations, and locations from Blench (2019).

Internal classification
The internal classification of Akokoid language varieties is given by Fadoro (2010) as:

Akokoid
Arigidi
Arigidi
Erushu
Ọ̀wọ̀n
varieties in Oke Agbe
Afa
Aje
Udo
Oge
varieties outside Oke Agbe
Oyin
Igashi
Uro

Arigidi and Erushu are mutually intelligible with each other; varieties spoken in Oke Agbe with each other; and varieties spoken outside Oke Agbe with each other. However, these three groups are not mutually intelligible with each other.

Reconstructions
The following list of Proto-Akokoid reconstructions is from Blench (n.d.).

{| class="wikitable sortable"
! Gloss !! Proto-Akokoid
|-
| head || *igírí
|-
| hair || *icírí
|-
| eye || *íjù
|-
| ear || *útó
|-
| nose || *úwɔ̃́
|-
| mouth || *odòrũ
|-
| tooth || *eɲĩ
|-
| tongue || *írɛ̃́
|-
| jaw || *àmgbà
|-
| chin || *ùlɛ, *olò
|-
| beard || *ìlɛ̀
|-
| neck || *ògúgɔ̀
|-
| breast || *íkpɔ
|-
| heart || *ɛ̀gɛ̀, *ɔkɔ̃̀
|-
| belly || *ìgɔ
|-
| stomach || 
|-
| navel || *ípɔ̃́
|-
| back || *òsũ
|-
| arm, hand || *úwɔ́
|-
| nail || *íŋgà
|-
| buttocks || *imbɔ̃̀
|-
| penis || *ìndù
|-
| vagina || 
|-
| thigh || #koko
|-
| leg || *ùhò
|-
| knee || *igɔ̀
|-
| body || *ìji
|-
| skin || *àla
|-
| bone || *íkpĩ
|}

See also
List of Proto-Akokoid reconstructions (Wiktionary)

References

Blench, Roger. Comparative Akokoid.

Volta–Niger languages